In Greek mythology, Stratius or Stratios (Ancient Greek: Στάτιος or Στράτιόν means 'of an army') may refer to three distinct figures:

 Stratius, an Orchomenian prince as the son of King Clymenus of the Minyans and possibly, Boudeia or Bouzyge, daughter of Lycus. He was the brother of Erginus, Arrhon, Pyleus, Azeus, Eurydice and Axia.
 Stratius, also known as Stratichus, son of King Nestor of Pylos.
 Stratius, one of the comrades of the Greek hero Odysseus. When the latter and 12 of his crew came into the port of Sicily, the Cyclops Polyphemus seized and confined them. The monster then slain Stratius and five others namely: Antiphon, Euryleon, Apheidas, Kepheus, and Menetos, while the remaining six survived.
 Stratius, one of the Suitors of Penelope who came from Zacynthus along with other 43 wooers. He, with the other suitors, was slain by Odysseus with the help of Eumaeus, Philoetius, and Telemachus.

Notes

References 

 Apollodorus, The Library with an English Translation by Sir James George Frazer, F.B.A., F.R.S. in 2 Volumes, Cambridge, MA, Harvard University Press; London, William Heinemann Ltd. 1921. ISBN 0-674-99135-4. Online version at the Perseus Digital Library. Greek text available from the same website.
Apollonius Rhodius, Argonautica translated by Robert Cooper Seaton (1853-1915), R. C. Loeb Classical Library Volume 001. London, William Heinemann Ltd, 1912. Online version at the Topos Text Project.
Apollonius Rhodius, Argonautica. George W. Mooney. London. Longmans, Green. 1912. Greek text available at the Perseus Digital Library.
Homer, The Odyssey with an English Translation by A.T. Murray, PH.D. in two volumes. Cambridge, MA., Harvard University Press; London, William Heinemann, Ltd. 1919. . Online version at the Perseus Digital Library. Greek text available from the same website.
Stephanus of Byzantium, Stephani Byzantii Ethnicorum quae supersunt, edited by August Meineike (1790-1870), published 1849. A few entries from this important ancient handbook of place names have been translated by Brady Kiesling. Online version at the Topos Text Project.
Tzetzes, John, Allegories of the Odyssey translated by Goldwyn, Adam J. and Kokkini, Dimitra. Dumbarton Oaks Medieval Library, Harvard University Press, 2015. 

Princes in Greek mythology
Suitors of Penelope
Minyan characters in Greek mythology
Messenian mythology